Stettiner may refer to:

 Am Stettiner Haff, Amt in the district of Vorpommern-Greifswald, in Mecklenburg-Vorpommern, Germany
 Oscar Stettiner (1878-1948), British art dealer
 Stettiner SC, former German association football club from the city of Stettin

German-language surnames
Toponymic surnames
Polish toponymic surnames
German toponymic surnames
Jewish surnames
Yiddish-language surnames